Tricky Hill is a summit in Cape Girardeau County, Missouri, in the United States. The hill lies about two miles east-southeast of Pocahontas.

References

Landforms of Cape Girardeau County, Missouri
Hills of Missouri